The Cathedral of Mren is a 7th-century Armenian church in an abandoned medieval town site called Mren. It is located in the Kars region of Turkey, near the border with Armenia, about 1.5 km west of the Akhurian River.

The church of Mren is a domed triple-nave basilica, believed, on the basis of an inscription on its west facade and on stylistic features, to have been built 631–639. It was built by David Saharuni, an Armenian ally of the emperor Heraclius, to celebrate the latter's entry into Jerusalem in 628.

See also 
 Odzun Church, an architecturally similar and contemporaneous three-nave basilica with dome in Odzun, Armenia

Further reading 

 Maranci, Christina, "New Observations on the Frescoes at Mren," Revue des Études Arméniennes 35 (2013): 203–225.
 Thierry, Michel and Nicole, "La cathédral de Mren et sa decoration," Cahiers Archaéologiques 21 (1971): 43–77.

External links 
 The Cathedral of Mren on VirtualAni.org
 The Cathedral of Mren on Gagik Arzumanyan's photo gallery
 Mren Cathedral at the Rensselaer Digital Collections
 3D model of Mren

Armenian Apostolic churches in Turkey
Armenian Apostolic cathedrals in Turkey
Oriental Orthodox congregations established in the 7th century
Armenian buildings in Turkey
7th-century churches in Turkey
Churches completed in 639